2nd AIBA European Olympic Boxing Qualifying Tournament was held from 7  – 12 April 2008 in Athens, Greece. During the tournament 193 boxers from 39 countries competed for 23 Olympic qualifying places in 11 different weight categories.

Qualifying

40 teams participated in this tournament: 

  
  
  
  
  
  
  
  
  
  
 
  
  
  (ENG - 4) (SCO - 1)
  
  
  
  
  
 
  
  
  
  
 
  
  
  
  
  
  
  
  
  
  
  
  
  
 

Competition System 
The competition system of the 2nd AIBA European Olympic Boxing Qualifying Tournament is the knockout round system. Each boxer fights one match per round.

The first two places in each weight provided direct qualification to the 2008 Olympics with and additional qualification place for 3rd place provided in the 54 kg, 69 kg and 75 kg classes after a box off between the two losing semi finalists.

Vittorio Parrinello (ITA, 54 kg), Andrey Balanov (RUS, 69 kg), and Georgios Gazis (GRE, 75 kg) booked the last available tickets to the Beijing Olympics, by winning their bronze contests in the last day of the 2nd AIBA Olympic Qualifying Tournament.

Medal summary

Medal table
Based on AIBA weightings which takes into consideration the number of bouts fought and number of competitors per team.

Key to AIBA decisions

See also
1st AIBA European 2008 Olympic Qualifying Tournament

References

External links
Medal and points ranking

Qualification for the 2008 Summer Olympics
Boxing at the 2008 Summer Olympics
AIBA European 2008 Olympic Qualifying Tournament
AIBA European 2008 Olympic Qualifying Tournament
International sports competitions hosted by Greece
Sports competitions in Athens
Boxing in Greece